National Art Glass Gallery is located at the Wagga Wagga Civic Centre which started collecting studio glass in 1979 under the name Wagga Wagga Art Gallery but was changed to its current name to recognise the galley's national significance.

collections

References

External links
 National Art Glass Gallery - Wagga Wagga Art Gallery

Art museums and galleries in New South Wales
Glass museums and galleries
Wagga Wagga
Art museums established in 1979
1979 establishments in Australia